Govan is a district in Glasgow, Scotland. 

Govan may also refer to:

Places 
 Govan, Saskatchewan, Canada
 Govan, South Carolina, USA
 Govan, Washington, USA
 Govans, Baltimore, Maryland, USA

Given name 
 St Govan (died 586), Irish monk in Pembrokeshire, Wales
 Govan Hinds, contestant in Big Brother in the UK
 Govan Mbeki (1910–2001), South African politician, father of Thabo Mbeki

Surname 
 Alex Govan (born 1929), Scottish footballer
 Andrew R. Govan (1794–1841), U.S. Representative from South Carolina
 Daniel Govan (1829–1911), American Confederate general
 Gerald Govan (born 1942), American basketball player
 Guthrie Govan (born 1971), English guitarist, brother of Seth
 James Govan (1949–2014), American R&B soul singer
 James Govan (cricketer) (born 1966), Scottish cricketer
 Jock Govan (1923–1999), Scottish footballer
 John George Govan (1861–1927), Scottish businessman and evangelist, father of Sheena 
 Michael Govan (born 1963), director of the Los Angeles County Museum of Art
 Sheena Govan (1912–1967), spiritual teacher, daughter of John George Govan
 Tommy Govan, Scottish football full back during the 1950s and 1960s
 William Govan (1623–1661), Scottish officer who fought for the Covenanters during the Wars of the Three Kingdoms

Other
 Govan (ward), electoral division of Glasgow City Council
 Govan High School, secondary school in Glasgow, Scotland
 Govan railway station, formerly on the Glasgow and Paisley Joint Railway
 Govan subway station, underground station and bus interchange
 Govan Shipbuilders, British shipbuilding company based on the River Clyde
 Kvaerner Govan, shipyard subsidiary formed from Govan Shipbuilders in 1988

See also
 Glasgow Govan (disambiguation)